JB Law College, its full name Jnanadabihram Borooah Law College, is a law school located in Guwahati, Assam, India. It was established in 1969 and the college was named after the name of Jnanadabihram Barooah, a well known personality in the legal field of Assam. The JBLC offers undergraduate and postgraduate law courses. The JB Law College is recognized by Bar Council of India and it also got a status of ' Section 2(f) of UGC Act, 1956 ' from University Grants Commission. The Law College is affiliated to Gauhati University.

References

Universities and colleges in Guwahati
Law schools in Assam
Educational institutions established in 1969
1969 establishments in Assam